NMT may refer to:

Science and technology
 Nordic Mobile Telephone, an analogue mobile phone system
 Neurologic Music Therapy
 Neural machine translation
 Network management protocols, in the CANopen communication protocol
 3-hydroxy-16-methoxy-2,3-dihydrotabersonine N-methyltransferase, an enzyme
 N-Methyltryptamine, an alkaloid similar to dimethyltryptamine
 Non-invasive micro-test technology, a scientific research technology

Other
 Needham Market railway station, UK National Rail code
 New Measurement Train, UK specialised testing train
 New Mexico Institute of Mining and Technology, a state university in New Mexico
 Nuremberg Military Tribunals, of Nazis after World War II